Sam Garba Okoye (22 December 1947 – 31 July 1978) was a Nigerian footballer who played as a forward for the Nigerian national football team after he made his debut in a match against Gabon on 30 August 1965. He also represented Nigeria at the 1968 Summer Olympics in Mexico.

References

1947 births
1978 deaths
Nigerian footballers
Association football forwards
Olympic footballers of Nigeria
Footballers at the 1968 Summer Olympics